At the 1990 Goodwill Games, two different gymnastics disciplines were contested: artistic gymnastics and rhythmic gymnastics.

Artistic Gymnastics

Medalists

Rhythmic Gymnastics

Medalists

Details

Artistic Gymnastics

Men

Team All-Around

Individual All-Around

Floor

Pommel Horse

Rings

Vault

Parallel Bars

Horizontal Bar

Women

Team All-Around   

For these countries the scores for each rotation are known but not the apparatuses they correspond to.

Individual All-Around

Vault

Uneven Bars

Balance Beam

Floor

Rhythmic Gymnastics

All-Around

Rope

Ball

Hoop

Ribbon

References 

1990 Goodwill Games
International gymnastics competitions hosted by the United States
1990 in gymnastics